Rangnath Wani is an Indian politician and member of the Shiv Sena. He was elected to Maharashtra Legislative Assembly for three consecutive terms from 1999 to 2014 from the Vaijapur Vidhan Sabha constituency in Aurangabad district, Maharashtra.

Positions held
 1999: Elected to Maharashtra Legislative Assembly
 2004: Re-Elected to Maharashtra Legislative Assembly
 2009: Re-Elected to Maharashtra Legislative Assembly

References 

Shiv Sena politicians
Members of the Maharashtra Legislative Assembly
Living people
Marathi politicians
Year of birth missing (living people)